Phyllonorycter auronitens is a moth of the family Gracillariidae. It is known from Québec in Canada and Massachusetts, Kentucky, Maine, North Carolina, Vermont and Connecticut in the United States.

The wingspan is 6.5-8.2 mm.

The larvae feed on Alnus species, including Alnus incana, Alnus rubra and Alnus rugosa. They mine the leaves of their host plant. The mine has the form of a tentiform mine on the underside of the leaf. The mine is roundish and the loosened epidermis is much wrinkled, resulting in the leaf being rather arched at this place.

References

auronitens
Moths of North America
Moths described in 1873